Piper Marten Ritter (born April 7, 1983) is an American, former collegiate softball pitcher and current head coach at Minnesota. Ritter played college softball at Minnesota from 2001 to 2004, and was named a four-time All-Big Ten Conference honoree. She is the school's career leader in WHIP. Ritter was undrafted and played one season in the National Pro Fastpitch in 2005 with the defunct Texas Thunder.

Early life
Ritter played at Farmington High School and led the Lady Scorpions to a state title and was named the 2000 Gatorade New Mexico Player of The Year. She also played as a third basemen.

Coaching career

Minnesota
Ritter served as an assistant coach at Minnesota for 13 seasons under four different head coaches.

On May 3, 2020, Ritter was named the head coach of Minnesota.

Statistics

Minnesota Gophers

Head coaching record

College

References

External links
 

1983 births
Living people
Softball players from New Mexico
Sportspeople from New Mexico
Female sports coaches
American softball coaches
Minnesota Golden Gophers softball players
Minnesota Golden Gophers softball coaches
Northern Colorado Bears softball coaches